American singer-songwriter Charlie Puth has released three studio albums, four extended plays, one video album, 29 singles, eight promotional singles, and 34 music videos. Puth released two extended plays, The Otto Tunes (2010) and Ego (2013), as an independent artist. In 2015 he signed with Atlantic Records and released his debut single "Marvin Gaye", which features guest vocals from Meghan Trainor. The single has been certified 2× Platinum in Australia, topped the charts in New Zealand, Ireland, and the United Kingdom. Puth wrote, co-produced, and was featured on a song by  Wiz Khalifa, "See You Again", included in the Furious 7 soundtrack. On May 1, 2015, Puth released an EP, Some Type of Love. The pre-order for Puth's debut studio album Nine Track Mind started on August 20, 2015, along with the second single "One Call Away". The album was officially released on January 29, 2016. Puth released his second studio album Voicenotes on May 11, 2018, supported by the singles "Attention", "How Long", "Done for Me", "Change", and "The Way I Am". His third album, Charlie, was released on October 7, 2022, which includes singles "Light Switch" and "Left and Right", featuring BTS' Jungkook.

Albums

Studio albums

Video albums

Extended plays

Singles

As lead artist

As featured artist

Promotional singles

Other charted songs

Other appearances

Production and songwriting credits

Music videos

Notes

References

Pop music discographies
Discographies of American artists